Miss Caffeina are a pop group from Spain who have released a number of singles since 2007. They have also released four albums since 2010. In 2019, their latest album reached number-one in Spanish charts.

Background
Formed in Spain in 2006, their style ranges from  pop, rock, indie, and Spanish styled music.

Career
Their debut album, Imposibilidad Del Fenómeno, was released in 2010.

In 2019, they released the album, Oh Long Johnson. The inspiration for the album title came from the Oh Long Johnson viral cat video. The reasoning was that it served as a reminder on how people concentrate on absurd things while the important things pass by. The album was a hit. It stayed in the Spanish charts for a total of ten weeks, peaking at #1 in March, 2019.

Discography

References

External links
 Discogs: Miss Caffeina

Spanish pop music groups